The women's 63 kg competition of the 2013 World Judo Championships was held on August 29.

Medalists

Results

Finals

Repechage

Pool A

Pool B

Pool C

Pool D

References

External links
 
 Draw

W63
World Judo Championships Women's Half Middleweight
World W63